Warrenton is an unincorporated community in Jefferson County, in the U.S. state of Ohio.

History
Warrenton was platted in 1805. A post office called Warrenton was established in 1806, and remained in operation until 1911.

References

Unincorporated communities in Jefferson County, Ohio
Unincorporated communities in Ohio